Jakob Lorenz (born 11 September 2001) is a Liechtensteiner footballer who currently plays for Vaduz.

International career
He is a member of the Liechtenstein national football team, making his debut in a 2022–23 UEFA Nations League match against Moldova on 25 September 2022. Lorenz also made six appearances for the Liechtenstein U21.

References

2001 births
Living people
Liechtenstein footballers
Association football midfielders
Liechtenstein international footballers
FC Vaduz players